Dompierre-aux-Bois is a commune in the Meuse department in Grand Est in north-eastern France. Dompierre-aux-Bois belongs to the association of the villages called "Dompierre" in France (22 villages). The inhabitants meet every year during the month of July.

Characteristics

Name 
The Latin origin of the name of Dompierre-aux-Bois is Domnus Petrus in Sylvis.

Setting 
The village is located in a valley, in a wooded area. The territory of the village is of 806 hectares. In the middle of the village, there is stream that was called "Ru du Moulin" in 1972. Now, it is simply called "Ruisseau de Dompierre". This stream's source is in the building where people would come in the past to wash their laundry. This building was initially built in 1821 and rebuilt in 1925. Since 1980, the spring is used to supply water to several neighbouring villages. As a result, the stream is now thinner, and during droughts, it's almost dry.

Population 
In 1836, the population was 385 persons. In 1911, it was 198 persons.
The population as of 2005 was 60 persons, of which 20 were under 20 years of age.

Resources 
In the 19th century, Dompierre-aux-Bois was essentially living of wood production. It was called the Meuse department's capital of the clog, with a production of 45,000 units per year. There was also a sawmill and a papermill. Embroidery was also an important activity with about 60 women working in this activity. Today, most residents of Dompierre live of agriculture.

History
Dompierre-aux-Bois was badly hit during the First World War. On 27 September 1914, 24 women, children and elderly who had stayed back in the church of the village were killed. The village was entirely destroyed during the war and its French population displaced as it was in a German controlled area.

See also 
 Communes of the Meuse department
 Parc naturel régional de Lorraine

References 

Dompierreauxbois